A cavaliers' house or cavalier house (from "cavalier" meaning horseman or cavalryman) was a building that formed part of the ensemble of a stately home, palace or schloss and was used to accommodate the royal or princely household. They emerged in the Baroque era.

The name is derived from the original use of such buildings for accommodating cavalrymen. Later it became synonymous for the building attached to a palace or stately home that was not used by the royal family themselves, but by courtiers, high officials, couriers or guests.

In Baroque ensembles, cavalier houses and palace were frequently around a cour d'honneur and could be linked by galleries or stand entirely separate. There were no hard and fast rules, so that a cavalier house could sometimes be found in the palace park. Depending on the area, size and importance of the actual residenz – and the status of its noble family – a cavalier house could even be a schloss in its own right or take on a more modest appearance sometimes resembling a burgher's house.

Examples

Austria 
 Cavalier House, Klessheim, Klessheim Palace, Salzburg state

Germany 
 Cavalier house, Gifhorn, Lower Saxony, today a museum
 Cavalier house inside the larger Schloss Pyrmont, Bad Pyrmont, Lower Saxony
 Cavalier house, Langenargen, Baden-Württemberg
 Cavalier house, Spremberg, Brandenburg
 Cavalier houses at Altenstein Palace, Bad Liebenstein, Thuringia
 Cavalier houses of Königs Wusterhausen, Brandenburg
 Cavalier house and hunting lodge in Darmstadt-Bessungen, Hesse
 Cavalier house at Moritzburg Castle, Saxony
 Cavalier house of Echzeller Burg, Echzell, Hesse, which is actually a palace

 Cavalier house of Rheinsberg Castle, Brandenburg

Literature / Sources 
Hans-Joachim Kadatz: Seemanns Lexikon der Architektur, Seemann, Leipzig, 2001. .

Palaces